Lottsburg is an unincorporated community in Northumberland County, in the U.S. commonwealth of Virginia.

References

Unincorporated communities in Northumberland County, Virginia